Released in 2016, Guess the Correlation is a minimalistic browser-based game with a purpose developed by Omar Wagih at the European Bioinformatics Institute. The game was developed to study human perception in scatter plots. Players are presented with a stream of scatter plots depicting the relationship between two random variables and are asked to guess how positively correlated they are. Guesses closer to the real correlation, are rewarded more points. The game features both single and two-player modes and has a retro 8-bit design and sound effects.

Collected guesses are used to better understand how humans perceive correlations in scatter plots by identifying features within scatter plots, such as outliers, that cause players to over or under estimate the true correlation. 

By 1 February 2016, over 2 million guesses had been collected from 100,000 participants.

Gameplay

In the single-player mode, players are presented with a stream of scatter plots depicting the relationship between two random variables. The aim is to guess the true Pearson correlation coefficient, where the guess can range from 0 (no correlation) to 1 (perfect positive correlation). Players start out with three lives and no points. Guesses made within 0.05 of the true correlation are awarded a life and five points. Guesses made within 0.10 are awarded one point, and guesses over 0.10 are not awarded any points and a life is deducted. The game ends when the player has run out of lives.

In the two player mode, opponents challenge each other at guessing the true correlation. Once a session has been initiated between two players, both players are presented with the same scatter plot. The player with the closest guess to true correlation is awarded a point. In the event of a draw, no points are awarded to either player. The first player to reach 10 points is declared the winner.

See also
Citizen science
Game with a purpose
List of crowdsourcing projects

References

External links

Professional studies
Perception
2016 video games
Browser games
Human-based computation games
Video games developed in the United Kingdom